The lowland mosaic-tailed rat (Paramelomys platyops) is a species of rodent in the family Muridae.
It is found in Indonesia and Papua New Guinea.

References

Paramelomys
Mammals described in 1906
Taxa named by Oldfield Thomas
Taxonomy articles created by Polbot
Rodents of New Guinea